Reese's Cupfusion is a shooting interactive dark ride that began operation on Saturday May 25, 2019 at Hersheypark. The ride features a turbulent journey through the Reese’s Central to stop Mint and his misfit candies from stealing the Crystal Cup that collects Reese’s Spirit. It was conceptualized and designed by Raven Sun Creative and is being built by Sally Corporation, the same manufacturer as that of Reese's Cupfusion's predecessor, Reese's Xtreme Cup Challenge, which closed on September 3, 2018.

Ride experience
Riders take on the role of security agents at Reese's Central. Led by Commander Cup, the riders keep the factory running by protecting the Reese's Crystal Cup. The cup collects people's love of chocolate and peanut butter known as Reese’s Spirit and creates energy that powers the factory. Mint the Merciless and his league of misfit candy try to steal it so they can use it for their own evil purposes. The riders' job is to fight back and to ensure that the world is never deprived of Reese’s.

References 

Hersheypark
Amusement rides introduced in 2019